Robert "T.J." Casner (born September 28, 1994) is an American soccer player.

Career

College & Semi-Professional
Casner played four years of college soccer at Clemson University from 2012 to 2015. In 2015, Casner was named to the First Team All-ACC as well as the First Team All-Region selections. Following these accolades, Casner was also named a Third Team All-American.

Professional
On January 19, 2016, Casner was selected 47th overall in the 2016 MLS SuperDraft by Houston Dynamo. He joined their United Soccer League affiliate Rio Grande Valley in March, 2016.

Casner made his professional debut for Rio Grande Valley on March 26, 2016 versus Tulsa Roughnecks FC.

Casner made his professional debut for Houston on June 15 in the Lamar Hunt U.S. Open Cup game versus San Antonio FC.  Casner was subbed on in the 71st minute for Damarcus Beasley.

References

External links
 

1994 births
American soccer players
Clemson Tigers men's soccer players
Houston Dynamo FC draft picks
Living people
Rio Grande Valley FC Toros players
Houston Dynamo FC players
Soccer players from California
Sportspeople from Irvine, California
Association football forwards